Tipperary North was a parliamentary constituency represented in Dáil Éireann, the lower house of the Irish parliament or Oireachtas, from 1948 to 2016. The constituency elected 3 deputies (Teachtaí Dála, commonly known as TDs). The method of election was proportional representation by means of the single transferable vote (PR-STV).

History and boundaries
It was created for the 1948 general election when the former Tipperary constituency was divided into Tipperary North and Tipperary South. The constituency underwent a significant revision to its boundaries at the 2007 general election. A population of 4,276 in the former Roscrea No 2 Rural District was transferred into constituency from the Laois–Offaly constituency. As well as the administrative county of North Tipperary and some parts of South Tipperary, it also included the southern tip of County Offaly. The 2006 population of the constituency using these revised boundaries was 80,203. The principal population centres were Thurles, Templemore, Nenagh and Roscrea.

The Electoral (Amendment) Act 2009 defined the constituency as:

"The county of North Tipperary;

and, in the county of South Tipperary, the electoral divisions of:

Ballysheehan, Clogher, Clonoulty East, Clonoulty West, Gaile, Graystown, Killenaule, Nodstown, in the former Rural District of Cashel;

Ballyphilip, Buolick, Crohane, Farranrory, Fennor, Kilcooly, New Birmingham, Poyntstown, in the former Rural District of Slievardagh;

Cappagh, Curraheen, Donohill, Glengar, in the former Rural District of Tipperary No. 1;

and, in the county of Offaly, the electoral divisions of:

Aghacon, Barna, Cangort, Cullenwaine, Dunkerrin, Ettagh, Gorteen, Mountheaton, Shinrone, Templeharry, in the former Rural District of Roscrea No. 2."

Tipperary North was a rare example of a bellwether constituency in Ireland; from 1969 onward, with the exception of February 1982, two of the three deputies it returned went on to support the resulting government. The constituency returned at least one TD for Fianna Fáil from 1948 until the 2011 general election.

It was abolished at the 2016 general election and replaced by the new Tipperary and Offaly constituencies.

TDs

Elections

2011 general election

2007 general election

2002 general election

1997 general election

1992 general election

1989 general election

1987 general election

November 1982 general election

February 1982 general election

1981 general election

1977 general election

1973 general election

1969 general election

1965 general election

1961 general election

1957 general election

1954 general election

1951 general election

1948 general election

See also
Dáil constituencies
Politics of the Republic of Ireland
Historic Dáil constituencies
Elections in the Republic of Ireland

References

External links
Oireachtas Members Database

Dáil constituencies in the Republic of Ireland (historic)
Historic constituencies in County Tipperary
1948 establishments in Ireland
Constituencies established in 1948
2016 disestablishments in Ireland
Constituencies disestablished in 2016